Alan Herbert Glasser is an American physicist.

While working for the Los Alamos National Laboratory, Glasser was elected a fellow of the American Physical Society in 1999, "[f]or contributions to the theory of toroidal ideal and resistive magnetohydrodynamic instabilities and their applications to plasma confinement for magnetic fusion energy research."

References

Los Alamos National Laboratory personnel
20th-century American physicists
Fellows of the American Physical Society
21st-century American physicists
Living people
Year of birth missing (living people)